Christian Bégin (born March 16, 1963 in Montreal, Quebec) is a Canadian actor, who won the Prix Iris for Best Actor at the 20th Quebec Cinema Awards in 2018 for his performance in Infiltration (Le problème d'infiltration).

His film roles have included Nelligan, Side Orders (Foie de canard et cœur de femme), The Pig's Law (La loi du cochon), The Collector (Le Collectionneur), My Daughter, My Angel (Ma fille, mon ange) Surviving My Mother (Comment survivre à sa mère), 9 (9, le film) and The Canadiens, Forever (Pour toujours, les Canadiens!), and the television series Trauma.

In 2019, he starred as a transgender prostitute in the comedy-drama series M'entends-tu?

References

External links

21st-century Canadian male actors
Canadian male film actors
Canadian male television actors
Male actors from Montreal
Living people
1963 births
Best Actor Jutra and Iris Award winners